Robert Nesta Glatzel (born 8 January 1994) is a German professional footballer who plays as a forward for 2. Bundesliga club Hamburger SV.

Early life
Glatzel was born in Bavaria to an Eritrean father and a German mother.

Career 
Born in Bavaria, Glatzel joined SC Fürstenfeldbruck, before he switched to SpVgg Unterhaching. In 2012, Glatzel joined the youth academy of 1860 Munich. After one year in the Munich-quarter of Giesing, he joined fourth-tier side SV Heimstetten and in September 2013, he switched to Wacker Burghausen in the professional 3. Liga. After struggling to maintain a regular place in Burghausen, Glatzel returned to 1860 Munich and played for the reserve team. In 2015, he left Bavaria and joined the 2. Bundesliga side 1. FC Kaiserslautern. Glatzel played for the reserve team and for the first team; for the latter, he made 19 appearances in the second division, scoring four goals.

In 2017, Glatzel joined 1. FC Heidenheim. On 3 April 2019, Glatzel played in a 5–4 defeat in the quarter-final match of the 2018-19 DFB-Pokal against top-flight Bayern Munich and scored three goals.

Cardiff City
On 31 July 2019, Glatzel signed for Championship side Cardiff City. He made his debut for the club in a 2–1 victory over Luton Town on 10 August. He scored his first goal for Cardiff on 13 September 2019 in a 1–1 draw away at Derby County.

Loan to Mainz 05
On 1 February 2021, Glatzel joined German club Mainz 05 on a loan deal until the end of the season.

Hamburger SV 
On 1 July 2021, Glatzel then joined German club Hamburger SV on a €1,000,000 fee. He then scored a goal in his debut match to help Hamburger SV win over FC Schalke 04 in a 1–3 victory on 23 July 2021.

Career statistics

References

External links
 
 

Living people
1994 births
Association football forwards
German footballers
German people of Eritrean descent
2. Bundesliga players
3. Liga players
English Football League players
TSV 1860 Munich II players
SV Wacker Burghausen players
1. FC Kaiserslautern II players
1. FC Kaiserslautern players
1. FC Heidenheim players
SpVgg Unterhaching II players
SV Heimstetten players
Cardiff City F.C. players
1. FSV Mainz 05 players
Hamburger SV players
Footballers from Bavaria